The Princess Alexandra Hospital is an acute general hospital in Harlow, Essex, England. It is managed by the Princess Alexandra Hospital NHS Trust.

History
The hospital, which was designed by Easton & Robertson and built on the site of Parndon Hall, the former home of Godfrey Arkwright, opened in phases between 1958 and 1966. The Kent Wing, designed by the Percy Thomas Partnership, opened in 1996 and the Jenny Ackroyd Centre, designed by Tangram Architects, opened in 2004.

Teaching 
The hospital serves as a teaching hospital for medical students from Anglia Ruskin University and Barts and The London School of Medicine and Dentistry.

In popular culture
A scene from the film A Clockwork Orange was shot at the hospital in 1970.

References

External links 

 
 Princess Alexandra Hospital on the NHS website
 Inspection reports from the Care Quality Commission

NHS hospitals in England
Hospitals in Essex
Harlow